This list of botanical gardens and arboretums in Wisconsin is intended to include all significant botanical gardens and arboretums in the U.S. state of Wisconsin.

See also
List of botanical gardens and arboretums in the United States

References 

 
Arboreta in Wisconsin
botanical gardens and arboretums in Wisconsin